Napa Valley Cricket Club is a cricket club in Napa Valley, that serves the expatriate and local cricket population of Napa County, California and beyond. The club was established in 2012  and plays its home games at the Napa Valley Exposition in the City of Napa, at the southern end of the Napa Valley. The club is affiliated to USA Cricket, the American Cricket Federation, the United States Youth Cricket Association, and Last Man Stands.

The club welcome members to play social cricket and includes members who hail from cricket playing countries including Afghanistan, Australia, Bangladesh, England, India, Ireland, New Zealand, Pakistan, South Africa and United States of America.

The club hosts an annual match dubbed the "Napa Valley World Series of Cricket"  each year where an intra-club game of cricket between members takes place. The teams are divided along their countries of birth and the game is generally between an American & Australian XI and a Rest of the World XI.

The club also hosts visiting teams on tour and has hosted Philadelphia Cricket Club, Merion Cricket Club, Beverly Hills Hollywood Cricket Club, Malibu Cricket Club, Hoboken Cricket Club, Meraloma Cricket Club, Compton Cricket Club captained by Nick Compton and also hosted a "Caribbean All-Stars" team captained by former West Indies Test Captain Alvin Kallicharran. In addition to hosting touring teams the Napa Valley Cricket Club undertakes an annual tour and has toured to Los Angeles twice, Philadelphia, San Diego, Phoenix, and Vancouver where they played a match at the Brockton Oval in Stanley Park.

Gallery

References

External links
Napa Valley Cricket Club

American club cricket teams
Cricket teams in California
History of United States cricket
Napa Valley
Cricket clubs established in 2012